Sten Pålsson (born 4 December 1945) is a Swedish footballer who played as a forward.

Career 
Pålsson began his playing career in Stångenäs AIS, after that he played for Kungshamns IF. In January 1968 he began to play with GAIS and played for the club in Allsvenskan and the second division until 1981. He played 149 matches and scored 40 goals in allsvenskan and, scored 41 goals in 145 division 2 appearances.

Pålsson made 19 appearances as a striker for the Sweden national football team and was a part of the squad in the 1970 FIFA World Cup.

References

External links 
 Pålsson site from GAIS website

1945 births
Living people
Swedish footballers
Sweden international footballers
1970 FIFA World Cup players
GAIS players
Association football forwards